The military history of Bhutan begins with the Battle of Five Lamas in 1634, marking Bhutan's emergence as a nation under the secular and religious leadership of Zhabdrung Ngawang Namgyal. Before Bhutan emerged as a separate nation, it remained on the periphery of Tibetan military and political influence. The region that became Bhutan was host to several battles and waves of refugees from turmoil in Tibet. After its founding, Bhutan was invaded numerous times by outside forces, namely Tibetans, Mongols, and the British. Bhutan meanwhile invaded its traditional tributaries in Sikkim, Cooch Behar, and the Duars.

Bhutan effectively ceased all international military hostilities in 1865 under the Treaty of Sinchula after its defeat by the British Empire. Under the terms of the subsequent Treaty of Punakha in 1910, Bhutan effectively became a British protectorate. Bhutan has maintained this status with India under Bhutan–India relations since 1949, and has modernly engaged only in limited domestic operations against Indian separatist groups.

Ancient history

The earliest military history of Bhutan generally related to that of Tibet. Between the 9th century and Bhutan's emergence as a nation in the early 17th century, Bhutanese territory hosted Tibetan military settlement, waves of refugees from religious and political strife in Tibet, and some conflict between Tibetan and Indian people.

In 824, Tibetan King Tritsun Desten (r. 816–836), also called Raelpachen and grandson of Trisong Detsen, went to war with an Indian ruler in Bhutan, driving him out. Tibetan troops who remained in Bhutan were called Milog, meaning "those that will not return." The region they settle were referred to as Tshochhen Gyed. Its eight parts or divisions were Wang, Be, Med, Kawang, Chang, Thi, Thim, and Lar. In 836, Tritsun Desten was murdered by agents of his brother Langdharma. Tibetans sought refuge in Bhutan from ensuing political and religious upheaval during the reign of Langdharma (836–842). After Langdharma's assassination in 842, Tibetans continued to flee to western Bhutan, the Ngalop homeland. The centuries that followed, known as the Era of Fragmentation, were characterized by their lack of political cohesion. During much of this period, the dominant Bhutanese polity was the Kingdom of Bumthang.

In the late 9th century, ethnic Tibetan forces expelled Indian princes from parts of modern Bhutan. Tibetans in this period and location developed the roots of Ngalop culture.

By the 11th century, Tibetan-Mongol forces occupied the whole of Bhutan. More waves of Tibetans sought refuge in Bhutan from religious persecution. Charismatic lamas became the de facto leaders of regions in western Bhutan. In the 1360s, another wave Tibetan Gelugpa monks fled to Bhutan.

Early history

The military history of Bhutan as a nation begins with warfare between founder Zhabdrung Ngawang Namgyal, himself a Tibetan refugee, and rulers of Tibet. Between 1627 and 1634, a series of wars culminated in the Battle of Five Lamas, the Zhabdrung emerging victorious. Military incursions from Tibet and the Mongol Empire continued through 1714. As Bhutan gained its own measure of regional power in the late 17th century, it invaded neighboring kingdoms in Sikkim, Cooch Behar, and the Duars.

In 1616, Zhabdrung Ngawang Namgyal, facing arrest and following visions in which it is said that the chief guardian deities of Bhutan offered him a home, left Tibet to establish a new base in western Bhutan, founding Cheri Monastery at the head of Thimphu valley. During the Bhutanese period of theocratic rule (1616–1907), there was no regular standing army. The bow and arrow were among the principal means of arming the population during frequent upheavals and invasions. During times of crisis, the government raised militias from among local lords' retinues, all commanded by one dapon ("arrow chief"), a title used through modern times.

Around 1627, the Zhabdrung built Simtokha Dzong at the entrance to Thimphu valley. From this dzong he exerted control over traffic between the powerful Paro valley to the west and Trongsa valley to the east. In 1627, during the first war against Karma Tenkyong of Tibet, Portuguese Jesuit Estêvão Cacella and another priest were the first recorded Europeans to visit Bhutan on their way to Tibet. They met with Ngawang Namgyal, presented him with firearms, gunpowder and a telescope, and offered him their services in the war against Tibet, but the Zhabdrung declined the offer. After a stay of nearly eight months, Cacella wrote a long letter from the Chagri Monastery reporting the travel.

In 1629 and 1631, attempted Tibetan invasions under Karma Tenkyong failed. In 1634, Zhabdrung Ngawang Namgyal prevailed in the Battle of Five Lamas over the Tibetan and Bhutanese forces allied against him. The Zhabdrung was thus the first to unite Bhutan into a single country. The Zhabdrung established the Drukpa Lineage as the state religion under the dual system of government, and codified the system of laws known as the Tsa Yig, based on Buddhist religious law (dharma).

In 1639, another attempted invasion by Karma Tenkyong failed, followed by a joint Mongol-Tibetan force in 1643 under Güshi Khan that sought to destroy Nyingmapa refugees who had fled to Bhutan, Sikkim, and Nepal. The Mongols had seized control of religious and civil power in Tibet in the 1630s and established Gelugpa as the state religion. Bhutanese rivals of Ngawang Namgyal encouraged the Mongol intrusion, but the Mongol force was easily defeated in the humid lowlands of southern Bhutan. In 1647, another attempted Tibetan invasion failed.

In 1680 and 1700, Bhutan invaded Sikkim. In 1714, Tibetan forces, aided by the Mongols, again invaded Bhutan but failed to gain control.

Many Bhutanese slaves during this period originated from Sikkim and the Assam Duars, objects of repeated raids by Bhutan over the centuries. A large number of these slaves were pressed into military service, and some went on to fill high posts in the Bhutanese armed forces.

Treaty of Sinchula

In the 18th century, Bhutan established its control over Cooch Behar and the Duars. As the presence of the British Empire grew in the region through the 19th century, these territories, as well as Bhutan's neighbor Sikkim, came under British control.

In 1730, Cooch Behar first requested Bhutanese assistance in repelling Mughal Empire encroachments, establishing a dependent relationship with Bhutan. In 1770, Bhutan again invaded Sikkim, supported by troops from Cooch Behar.

In 1772, during a succession dispute in Cooch Behar, the Druk Desi's nominee for the throne was opposed by a rival who invited British troops; in effect, Cooch Behar became a dependency of the British East India Company. Between 1772–3, British expeditionary forces drove Bhutanese garrisons out of Cooch Behar, until that time a Bhutanese dependency. The Druk Desi petitioned Lhasa unsuccessfully for assistance.

On 25 April 1774, the Druk Desi signed a Treaty of Peace with the British East India Company. Under the treaty, Bhutan returned to its pre-1730 boundaries and allows the British to harvest timber in Bhutan. In 1784, British government turned over to Bhutan the Bengal Duars territory, where boundaries had been poorly defined. As in its other foreign territories, Bhutan left administration of the Bengal Duars territory to local officials and collected its revenues.

In 1838, after a prior failed attempt, the British mission to Thimphu offered Bhutan a treaty providing for the extradition of Bhutanese officials responsible for incursions into Assam, free and unrestricted commerce between India and Bhutan, and settlement of Bhutan's debt to the British. In an attempt to protect its independence, Bhutan rejected the British offer. In 1841, the British annexed the Bhutanese controlled Assam Duars, paying a compensation of 10,000 rupees a year to Bhutan. The following year, Bhutan ceded control of the troublesome Bengal Duars to Britain.

In 1862, Bhutanese forces raided Sikkim and Cooch Behar. The British responded by withholding all compensation payments and demanding release of all captives and return of stolen property. These demands went unheeded by the Druk Desi, as he was alleged to be unaware of frontier officials' raids. In 1864, Britain sent a peace mission to Bhutan in the wake of a recent civil war, during a period when two rival claimants to the office of Druk Desi competed for power. Though the British attempted to deal with both Druk Desis, the peace mission was rejected by Bhutan.

In November 1864, Britain declared war on Bhutan over control of its traditional dependencies. The Bhutan War lasted five months, resulting in Bhutan's defeat and loss of Assam Duars and Bengal Duars, as well as the eighty-three-square-kilometer territory of Dewangiri in southeastern Bhutan, to the British. In return, Bhutan was awarded an annual subsidy of 50,000 rupees under the Treaty of Sinchula, signed 11 November 1865.

Monarchy and Treaty of Punakha

In the 1870s and 1880s, renewed conflict among regional rivals — primarily the pro-British penlop of Trongsa and the anti-British, pro-Tibetan penlop of Paro — resulted in the ascendancy of Trongsa Penlop Ugyen Wangchuck. By 1885, he had put down unrest across Bhutan, consolidated power, and cultivated closer ties with British India. Between 1903–4, Ugyen Wangchuck volunteered to accompany a British mission to Lhasa as a mediator in the British expedition to Tibet and subsequent Anglo-Tibetan Convention. In return, he was knighted and thereafter continued to accrue greater power in Bhutan.

On 8 January 1910, the Treaty of Punakha amended two articles of the 1865 Treaty of Sinchula: the British agreed to double the annual stipend to 100,000 rupees and "to exercise no interference in the internal administration of Bhutan." In turn, Bhutan agreed "to be guided by the advice of the British Government in regard to its external relations."

In 1943, the Kingdom of Bhutan began to raise its first organized an army at Trongsa, recruiting 30 Kheng troops from Mongar. During the late 1940s, the second King of Bhutan, Jigme Wangchuck, began sending recruits for training by the Indian Army in Shillong. The army recruited a further 240 men from Bumthang, Kurtoe, Mongar, and Trashigang. After basic training, the number of enlisted men came to 120 soldiers, including 20 instructors. From early on, the Bhutanese army operated security checkpoints in the southern region of the kingdom.

In 1947, as the British Empire left India, direct ties to the British ended, and Bhutan remained relatively isolated from international affairs, until 1949. That year, India and Bhutan signed the Treaty of Peace and Friendship, providing that India would not interfere in Bhutan's internal affairs but that Bhutan would be guided by India in its foreign policy. This was the first international agreement that unambiguously recognized Bhutan's independence and sovereignty. The same year, India ceded to Bhutan some territories lost to the British in the 1865 Treaty of Sinchula.

Modern history

The modern Bhutanese armed forces comprise the Royal Bhutan Army (RBA), Royal Bodyguards (RBG), militia, and the Royal Bhutan Police. As Bhutan is a landlocked country, it has no navy. Nor does Bhutan have an air force, although the Royal Bhutan Army maintains a very small air armament possessing no combat capabilities, used solely for transport. The Royal Bodyguards are a branch of the RBA responsible for the security of the King of Bhutan, the Royal Family, and other VIPs.

Under defense agreements in place since 1949, India is responsible for military training, arms supplies and the air defense of Bhutan. This agreement was affirmed and updated in February 2007 with a new treaty of friendship.

Bhutan's most recent military engagements targeted Indian separatist groups operating inside Bhutan. During Operation All Clear in December 2003, Bhutanese armed forces cooperated with the Indian military in flushing out Indian militants.

Royal Bhutan Army

The Royal Bhutan Army was formed in the 1950s in response to the Chinese takeover and subsequent People's Liberation Army actions in Tibet and under intense pressure by India. In 1958, the royal government introduced a conscription system and plans for a standing army of 2,500 soldiers. The Indian government had also repeatedly urged and pressured Bhutan to end its neutrality or isolationist policy and accept Indian economic and military assistance. This was because India considered Bhutan its most vulnerable sector in its strategic defense system in regards to China. When Bhutan accepted the Indian offer, the Indian Army became responsible for the training and equipping of the RBA.

The RBA established its first domestic training center at Bumthang. Around 1951, it was relocated to Lingkana and Tashichho Dzong. In 1959, another training center was established at Tencholing, which also served as the RBA general headquarters. In 1963, the Army Headquarters was moved to Dradimakhang, Thimphu. During the 1960s, the RBA established four wings, numbered as Wing 1 (Gunitsawa), Wing 2 (Changju), Wing 3 (Laya & Lingzhi), and Wing 4 (Trashigang).

By 1968, the RBA consisted of 4,850 soldiers, with a recruiting goal of 600 additional soldiers a year. By 1990, the RBA was a force of 6,000 soldiers. In June 2007, the RBA stood at 9,021 active duty personnel. By 2008, this number was reduced to 8,000 active duty personnel, in line with an initiative introduced in 2005 by the Royal Government of Bhutan to reduce the strength of the RBA while increasing militia training of the Bhutanese population. In 2021, the first cohort of women were admitted to the Army.

The Indian Army maintains a training mission in Bhutan, known as the Indian Military Training Team (IMTRAT), responsible for the military training of RBA and RBG personnel. RBA and RBG officers are sent for training at the National Defence Academy (NDA) in Pune, and Indian Military Academy (IMA) in Dehradun. Project DANTAK of the Border Roads Organisation, a sub-division of the Indian Army Corps of Engineers, has been operating in Bhutan since May 1961. Since then Project DANTAK has been responsible for the construction and maintenance of over 1,500 km of roads and bridges, Paro Airport and a disused airfield at Yangphula, heliports, and other infrastructure. While these serve India's strategic defence needs, it is also an obvious economic benefit for the people of Bhutan.

Combat operations

The Kingdom of Bhutan has engaged solely in domestic combat operations against Indian separatist groups during the winter of 2003–2004. Secessionist militant groups active in India, having established bases in southern Bhutan, defied an ultimatum to leave the kingdom. With the support of the Indian Armed Forces, the Royal Bhutan Army engaged militant camps and eliminated them all in Operation All Clear.

During the early 1990s, Indian separatist groups, namely the United Liberation Front of Asom (ULFA), National Democratic Front of Bodoland (NDFB), and Kamtapur Liberation Organization (KLO), had begun to clandestinely set up camps in Bhutan's dense southern jungles. These camps were used to train cadres, store equipment, and launch attacks on targets in India. The Bhutanese government became aware of their presence in 1996 and from 1997, the issue was regularly discussed in the National Assembly. The Government of India began exerting diplomatic pressure on the Royal Government to remove the militant presence and offered conducting joint military operations against the militants. The Royal Government preferring a peaceful solution, declined the offer and instead initiated dialogue with the militant groups in 1998.

By December 2003, negotiations failed to produce any agreement and the Royal Government unable to tolerate their presence any longer issued a 48-hour ultimatum on 13 December. On 15 December the RBA commenced military operations, dubbed Operation All Clear, against the militant groups. A combined RBA and RBG force of 6,000, operating out of 20 camps established during the six years of negotiations, attacked an estimated 3,000 militants spread across 30 militant camps. By 27 December 2003, all 30 militant camps had been captured. Additionally, the RBA seized "more than 500 AK 47/56 assault rifles and 328 other assorted weapons including rocket launchers and mortars, along with more than 100,000 rounds of ammunition. An anti-aircraft gun was also found at the site of the GHQ of the ULFA."

By 3 January 2004, all 30 militant camps (ULFA-14, NDFB-11, KLO-5) with an additional 35 observation posts, were destroyed and the militants dislodged. A total of 485 ULFA, NDFB, and KLO militants were killed, while those captured along with seized weapons and ammunition were handed over to the Government of India. Captured non-combatants were handed over to Assamese civil authorities. The RBA suffered 11 soldiers KIA, and 35 WIA.

Royal Bhutan Police

The Royal Bhutan Police is responsible for maintaining law and order and prevention of crime in Bhutan. It was formed on 1 September 1965 with 555 personnel reassigned from the Royal Bhutan Army. It was then called the "Bhutan Frontier Guards." Its independent statutory basis was first codified with the Royal Bhutan Police Act of 1980. This framework was repealed and replaced in its entirety by the Royal Bhutan Police Act of 2009. Since 2009, the mandate of the Royal Bhutan Police has grown to include managing prisons, facilitating youth development and rehabilitation, and disaster management.

See also
History of Bhutan
Military of Bhutan
Foreign relations of Bhutan

References

 
History of Bhutan